Events in the year 2011 in Hong Kong.

Incumbents
 Chief Executive: Donald Tsang

Events
e

See also
 List of Hong Kong films of 2011

References

 
Years of the 21st century in Hong Kong
Hong Kong
Hong Kong